Ariela María de los Milagros Luna Florez (born 21 October 1958) is a Peruvian physician and anthropologist. She was her country's Minister of Development and Social Inclusion (MIDIS) from 29 October 2019 to 15 July 2020, during the government of Martín Vizcarra.

Early life and education
Ariela Luna studied medicine at the National University of San Marcos. She holds a master's degree in public health from the Cayetano Heredia University, and a diploma in anthropology from the Pontifical Catholic University of Peru.

Professional career
In 2004, Luna became president of the KALLPA Association for the Promotion of Comprehensive Health and Development, an NGO.

From 2008 to 2009, she served as general director of health promotion at Peru's Ministry of Health. From August 2011 to January 2012, she was head of the ministry's advisory cabinet.

In April 2014, she was appointed by President Ollanta Humala as Vice Minister of Policies and Social Evaluation of the Ministry of Development and Social Inclusion, under the management of minister . She remained in office until September 2016, and served again in the same post from March to October 2019. Along with Bustamante, she promoted the programs Childhood First and Permanent Exit From Poverty.

Selected publications
 La salud para la escuela: Manuel para coordinadores de salud (1998)
 Salud materna indígena: Caja de herramientas para la incorporación del componente intercultural en proyectos de reducción de muerte materna (2010), 
 Inclusión social: instrumentos de gestión y resultados de política (2015)

References

External links
 

1958 births
21st-century Peruvian physicians
Government ministers of Peru
Living people
National University of San Marcos alumni
Peruvian women physicians
Pontifical Catholic University of Peru alumni
Women government ministers of Peru